The William C. Carter Award is a technical award presented annually since 1997 to recognizing an individual who has made a significant contribution to the field of dependable and secure computing throughout his or her PhD dissertation. It is named after, and honors, the late William C. Carter, an important figure in the field. The award is sponsored by IEEE Technical Committee on Fault-Tolerant Computing (TC-FTC) and the IFIP Working Group on Dependable Computing and Fault Tolerance (WG 10.4).

Past recipients

See also

 List of computer science awards

References

Awards established in 1997
Computer science awards
IEEE awards
Student awards